Delhi's ethnic groups are diverse. The Yamuna river's flood plains provide fertile alluvial soil suitable for agriculture but are prone to recurrent floods. The Yamuna, a sacred river in Hinduism, is the only major river flowing through Delhi. The original natives of Delhi are those whose ancestors lived in the Yamuna basin, a region which spreads radially from the capital up to a distance of approximately 200 kilometres. Today the migrant population consists largely of Punjabis, Bengalis and recently,' Biharis.

During parts of the British Raj, Delhi was made a district city of the Punjab Province of British India. This province was not ethnically homogeneous and large amounts of Hindi speakers resided in the southeast, now Haryana and Delhi.

Caste and politics 
 According to a 2013 The Hindu article, surveys by the political parties indicate that the dominant voter caste / community groups in Delhi include the Jats (10%), Punjabis (9%), Vaish (8%), Gujjars (9% ) and Sikhs (6%). 
 A 2013 The Pioneer report estimates Jats to be only 5.5% of the total electorate. 
 According to another 2013 The Pioneer report, the Brahmins comprise 12-14% of Delhi's population. 
 According to a 2015 India TV article, the major voter social groups include Punjabis (different castes and religions) (35%), Purvanchalis (24%), Muslims (12%), Jats (8%), Vaish (8%), Gujjars (7%), Sikhs (5%) and around 3.5 million Uttarakhandis.
 According to a 2015 report by The Tribune, Delhi has 81% Hindus and 11.7% Muslims. 35% Punjabi population controls 15-20% vote share in at least 20 constituencies. Purvanchalis, as per the report, were at 4 million.
 A 2017 article by the Indian Express reported a total of 1.2 to 1.4 million voters who have roots in Uttarakhand.

Gujjars, Punjabi Khatris and Brahmins dominated politics in Delhi for many decades. Numerically high, the ethnic Punjabis are predominantly Hindi-speaking Punjabi Hindus.

In the 2015 Legislative Assembly election, 12 out of Delhi's 70 constituencies were reserved for scheduled caste (Dalit) candidates because of dominant Dalit population.

Migrants 
The Indian censuses record the native languages, but not the descent of the citizens. Linguistic data cannot accurately predict ethnicity: for example, many descendants of the Punjabi Hindu and Sikh refugees who came to Delhi following the partition of India now speak Hindi natively. Thus, there is no concrete official data on the ethnic makeup of Delhi.

Delhi is an ancient city, and the people residing in the Yamuna River basin were the original natives of the city. However, being a historical capital and prominent city, Delhi has always attracted a large number of immigrants. When the capital of British India was shifted from Calcutta to Delhi, a substantial number of government personnel, especially from the Bengal, migrated to Delhi. Following the partition of India in 1947, a large number of people migrated to Delhi. These included a large number of Punjabis (with a relatively small number of Sindhis), which led to the characterisation of Delhi as a "Punjabi city". According to the first census right after partition, the 1951 census, Delhi had a total population of 1,744,072 people which included:

By 1991, the number of those born outside Delhi was 3.7 million (out of a total population of 9.4 million). Most of these included immigrants from Uttar Pradesh (1.75 million) and Rajasthan (0.23 million). However, these neighbouring states are themselves ethnically diverse, so it is hard to use this data for determining the ethnic make-up of Delhi. There are also a large number of immigrants from the East Indian states of Bihar, Jharkhand, Orissa and Bengal. The number of South Indians is relatively less, with most of them coming from Kerala and Tamil Nadu. There are also several immigrants from the North-East India, who have migrated to Delhi because of the conflicts and bad economy in their native states. Today Hindi and Punjabi are still the most widely spoken languages in Delhi and have become the lingua franca. English is the principal written language of the city and the most commonly used language in government work and in Delhi's huge financial sector. In addition to Hindi, Punjabi and English,  Urdu also has official language status in Delhi.

See also 
 List of Scheduled Castes in Delhi

References

External links
 Delhi District Gazetteer 1883

Delhi